This article lists all rugby league players who have played first-grade for the Manly Warringah Sea Eagles in the National Rugby League.

NOTES:
 Debut:
 Players are listed in the order of their debut game with the club.
 If multiple players made their debut in the same game, the numbers have been allocated alphabetically.
 Appearances: Manly Sea Eagles games only, not a total of their career games. For example, Brent Kite has played a career total of 313 first-grade games but of those, 221 were at Manly.
 Previous Club: refers to the previous first-grade rugby league club (NRL or Super League) the player played at and does not refer to any junior club, Rugby Union club or a rugby league club he was signed to but never played at.
 The statistics in this table are correct as of the end of the 2022 NRL season.

List of players

References

Players
 
Lists of Australian rugby league players
National Rugby League lists
Sydney-sport-related lists